Zimber used as a surname and believed to be Germanic but the meaning is undefined.  Used as a surname in Eastern Europe since the 17th Century.
  
Zimber may be a variant of the German word Kimber or members of a historic second  century Germanic ethnic group.  Now called the Cimbri. Kimber (name) is also a forename and surname.

Zimber and Zimmer is a German exonym for Cembra and related to the Cimbri ancestry.

Zimber may also be a corruption of Zimble(r) or Tsimbl. This was an ancient medieval stringed instrument played by plucking the strings with the fingers or a plectrum.  This instrument  is similar to a Psaltery, Dulcimer or Cymbalom.
Note: The German word Zimbel is cymbal (music), while Zimbal is Cymbalom.

People with this or similar surname
 Diana Zimber, a member of the Tommy Gorman family
 Liane Zimbler, née Juliana Fischer - an early female architect

Places
 Zimber or Zimmers, a German exonyms name for the Italian Cembra a municipality of Trentino

See also

References

German words and phrases
Archaic words and phrases
Surnames of German origin